George Bain "Blue" Johnston" (27 March 1907, date of death unknown) was an Australian rules footballer who played for Glenelg in the South Australian National Football League (SANFL) between 1927 and 1940.

Johnston was nicknamed "Blue" in typical Australian fashion due to his red hair.  Johnston played when the Glenelg club (formed in 1920) was still very much struggling to be competitive against the other seven, more established, sides in the League.  Indeed, apart from the 1934 premiership, the highest the club finished during Johnston's playing career was sixth.

Johnston played 203 league games (the first Glenelg player to pass the 200 mark) during his career, won three best and fairest awards, and put in a best afield performance as the club broke its premiership duck against Port Adelaide  in 1934.  He also won the SANFL's highest individual honour – the Magarey Medal for the best and fairest player – in 1934.

Jeff Pash, himself a Magarey Medallist in 1939, described Johnston as "a phenomenal leaper for the ball ... he had the sort of (frightening) steel-spring strength about him that John Coleman had.  All of him – and he was tall and strong – was up there for that ball."

Although smaller than most opposition ruckmen, in addition to his brilliant leap, he was extraordinarily powerful, an asset which served him well when playing for South Australia against the bigger bodies of Victoria.

Family
George "Blue" Johnston was a son of George Johnston, captain of the S.S. Cadell on the Spencer Gulf trade, and the Charles Sturt on the River Murray. His grandfather, George Bain Johnston, was a noted pioneer of the River Murray steamboat era.

External links

References 

1907 births
Australian rules footballers from South Australia
Glenelg Football Club players
Magarey Medal winners
South Australian Football Hall of Fame inductees
Year of death missing